The tour started immediately after Christmas and ended in mid-January. Michael Mence, a member of the 1976-77 MCC team, was the captain of the side, which included three former Test players, John Jameson, John Hampshire, and Richard Hutton.

The MCC team
 
 Michael Mence (captain)
 Asif Din
 John Hampshire
 Richard Hutton
 John Jameson
 Richard Lewis
 Dermott Monteith
 Andrew Needham
 Mark Nicholas
 Steve Plumb
 Nick Stewart 
 Stuart Surridge
 Hugh Wilson

Lt. Col. J. R. Stephenson was the manager.

Scores in brief

In the first match, Central Zone just managed to avoid defeat. The fearsome bowling of the tall fast bowler Wilson created havoc in the local camp.

At Faridpur, in the first innings the MCC batting collapsed badly against the medium pace of Obaidul Haq Azam. His 7/18 was the best bowling by a Bangladeshi bowler at the time, breaking Syed Ashraful's record of 7/23 in the 1979 ICC Trophy against Fiji. Also, this match marked the international debut for Gazi Ashraf Lipu. He went to play a significant role in the development of Bangladesh cricket.

The Chittagong match was abandoned early on the 2nd day due to bad weather.
The infamous weather of Chittagong intervened to spoil the match. Raquibul Hasan was specially unlucky, as he looked set for his first hundred in Bangladeshi colours.

The drawn match at Rajshahi was dominated by the spinners of both the sides. The slow turning pitch made strokeplay extremely difficult. The Bangladeshi top order batting collapsed against the spin of Dermott Monteith on the 1st day. But the lower order, led by captain Hira and ever reliable Jahangir Shah fought back. Off spinner, Anwarul Amin Azhar showed class during the MCC innings. Only the veteran, Jameson, on his 2nd tour of Bangladesh could handle him properly. Azhar is widely regarded as the best Bangladeshi spinner of the decade. The Bangladesh batting collapsed again in the 2nd innings, but young Mujibul Haq stood firm to save the match.

Raquibul Hasan scored half centuries in each innings at Dhaka. He got good support from the opener Yousuf Babu in the 2nd innings. But the match belonged to Mark Nicholas. Batting at number three, the Hampshire batsman amassed the first century by an MCC player against Bangladesh.
The only match to produce a result was the one-day match where the inexperience of the local players in the shorter version of the game was exposed.

These matches saw the emergence of a number of talented youngsters in Bangladesh cricket, like Gazi Ashraf Lipu, Rafiqul Alam, Mujibul Haq, Nehal Hasnain, Obiadul Haq Azam, Nadir Shah, and Manjur Ahmed Manju. While some of them failed to live up to the expectations, Lipu, Rafiq & Nehal went on to play vital role in Bangladesh cricket throughout the 80s.

References

1980 in Bangladeshi cricket
1980 in English cricket
1981 in Bangladeshi cricket
1981 in English cricket
Bangladeshi cricket seasons from 1971–72 to 2000
English cricket tours of Bangladesh
International cricket competitions from 1980–81 to 1985
Bangladesh 1980-81